Medea Chakhava (May 15, 1921 – September 7, 2009) was a Georgian theater and film actress.

Career
Chakhava was born on May 15, 1921, in Martvili, Georgia. Her father was the Georgian doctor, Vasil Chakhava. Chakhava first appeared at the Rustaveli Theatre in 1941 and made her film debut in 1942. Chakhava later graduated from the State University of Theatre and Film in 1944. She joined the Rustaveli Theatre  company in Tbilisi following her graduation.

Among the state awards bestowed on Chakhava during her career, which spanned both the Soviet Union and the independent Republic of Georgia, was the title of National Artist.

A star bearing her name was dedicated outside the Rustaveli Theatre in 2006.

Medea Chakhava died on September 7, 2009, at the age of 88.

References

External links

Medea Chakhava on Georgian National Filmography
Rustaveli Theatre's Medea Chakhava biography

1921 births
2009 deaths
People from Samegrelo-Zemo Svaneti
Mingrelian women
Stage actresses from Georgia (country)
Film actresses from Georgia (country)
20th-century actresses from Georgia (country)